EAA may refer to:

Education 
 Education Achievement Authority, in Michigan
 Educational Assessment Australia
 Egypt Aviation Academy
 Escondido Adventist Academy, a school in California
 Estonian Academy of Arts

Sport 
 European Arenas Association
 European Athletic Association
 Atlantic 10 Conference, formerly known as the Eastern Athletic Association
 Eastern Sports Club, a Hong Kong sports club also known as Eastern Athletic Association

Science and medicine 
 Essential amino acid
 Ethyl acetoacetate
 Excitatory amino acid
 Extrinsic allergic alveolitis

Transport 
 Eagle Airport, in Alaska
 East African Airways, defunct
 Electric Auto Association
 Experimental Aircraft Association

Other uses 
 Ecumenical Advocacy Alliance
 Emergency Architects Australia
 European American Armory, an American firearms company
 European Association of Archaeologists
 Everglades Agricultural Area, in Florida
 Karenggapa language